John S. Park Historic District, composed of the Park Place Addition and Vega Verde subdivisions, is in Las Vegas, Clark County, Nevada. The historic district is named for John S. Park who arrived in Las Vegas in 1907. It was listed on the United States National Register of Historic Places in 2003.

The neighborhood was named by the American Planning Association as one of the 10 best neighborhood in the United States for 2010.

Geography
The city listed the John S. Park Historic District which is bounded by  Charleston Boulevard, Las Vegas Boulevard, Franklin Avenue, and South Ninth Street, and 5th Place on its historic register on March 19, 2003.

History 

The John S. Park Neighborhood Association was formed in 1995. When local casino owner Bob Stupak announced plans to build a replica of the Titanic in the area, homeowners were inspired to work to preserve their neighborhood from commercial development.

References

External links
The John S. Park Online Museum
The John S. Park Historic District

Parks in Clark County, Nevada
History of Las Vegas
National Register of Historic Places in Las Vegas
Architecture in Las Vegas
Houses on the National Register of Historic Places in Nevada
Houses in Clark County, Nevada
Historic districts on the National Register of Historic Places in Nevada